Populin is a glucoside occurring in the bark, buds and leaves of certain species of poplar. The alkaline cleavage of populin produces benzoate and the glucoside salicin.

References 

Phenol glucosides
Benzoate esters